The Jiulong River, formerly known as the Longjiang or Zhangjiang, is the largest river in southern Fujian and the second largest in the province. Like all Fujianese rivers but one, it flows into the Taiwan Strait.

Course
The Beixi rises in the prefecture of Longyan; it flows east into the prefecture of Zhangzhou, where it merges with the Xixi to form the Jiulong. The Xixi, almost as long, begins in Zhangzhou's rural Pinghe County. The combined stream flows past the urban districts of Zhangzhou and Xiamen. Finally, it empties into Xiamen Bay on the Taiwan Strait.

See also
Yuegang, a smuggling port at the mouth of the river

Notes

References

Rivers of Fujian